William S. Brock Sr. (1895 – November 13, 1932) was an aviation pioneer. With Edward F. Schlee he made the eighth non-stop crossing of the Atlantic Ocean.

Biography
He was born in 1895. He married Violet Harrison January 23, 1915 in Rochester, New York and had as their son, William S. Brock Jr. In 1927, he and  Edward F. Schlee planned to fly around the world in their airplane "Pride of Detroit". He died on November 13, 1932 at Presbyterian Hospital in Chicago, Illinois of cancer.

Legacy
The airplane "Pride of Detroit" is in the Henry Ford Museum in Dearborn, Michigan.

References

External links

1895 births
1932 deaths
American aviators